Voyage to Nowhere is a 1986 Spanish comedy drama film written, starred and directed by Fernando Fernán Gómez. It is based on his own novel with the same title.

Awards
The film won the First Goya Award ever given as Best Film, Best Director and Best Screenplay.

Plot
The film tells the story of a group of comedians. It is a story about their loves and heartbreaks and their desires and frustrations.

Throughout the journey, their work is interspersed with love, family financial problems, and the hunger to triumph a dream. The central character, Carlos Galván, is the son of the first actor and director of the company, don Arturo, and he's the father of Carlito, a kid who does not want to be a comic. Carlos Galván takes refuge in a fantasy world.

Cast
José Sacristán as Carlos Galván
Laura del Sol as Juanita Plaza
Juan Diego as Sergio Maldonado
María Luisa Ponte as Julia Iniesta
Gabino Diego as Carlos Piñeiro
Nuria Gallardo as Rosita del Valle
Fernando Fernán Gómez as Don Arturo
Queta Claver as Doña Leonor
Emma Cohen as Sor Martirio
Agustín González as Zacarías Carpintero
Carlos Lemos as Daniel Otero
Miguel Rellán as Dr. Arencibia
Simón Andreu as Solís
José María Caffarel
Carmelo Gómez
Tina Sáinz
Nacho Martínez

External links
 

1986 films
Spanish comedy-drama films
1986 comedy-drama films
1980s Spanish-language films
Spain in fiction
Films based on Spanish novels
Films directed by Fernando Fernán Gómez
Best Film Goya Award winners
1980s Spanish films